Parochialstrasse in Berlin is the title of a series of similar paintings by German artist Eduard Gaertner. Done in oil on canvas, the compositions depict the rapidly-industrializing urban landscape of 1830s Berlin, then the capital of the Kingdom of Prussia. The work shows people going about their day, street dogs, and the central street culminates in the Nikolaikirche, Berlin's oldest church. Three compositions were produced; one is in the collection of the Metropolitan Museum of Art, one was destroyed in World War II, and one is in the collection of the Nationalgalerie in Berlin.

References 

Paintings in the collection of the Metropolitan Museum of Art
1831 paintings
German paintings